Evergreen is an unincorporated community in Florence County, South Carolina, United States.  The community is located at the intersection of SC 51, SC 327 and Lebanon Road (S-21-149), halfway between Florence and Pamplico.

References

Unincorporated communities in Florence County, South Carolina
Unincorporated communities in South Carolina